Mennecy is a commune in the Essonne department in Île-de-France in northern France.

Geography
Mennecy is 33 kilometers south east of Paris-Notre-Dame, point zero from roads of France, 8 kilometers south of Évry, 6 kilometers south west of Corbeil-Essonnes, 11 kilometers north east of La Ferté-Alais, 14 kilometers east of Arpajon, 15 kilometers south east of Montlhéry, 19 kilometers north of Milly-la-Forêt, 22 kilometers south east of Palaiseau, 25 kilometers north east of Étampes, 31 kilometers north east of Dourdan. It is crossed by the river Essonne.

Population
Inhabitants of Mennecy are known as Menneçois in French.

Twin towns
Mennecy is twinned with the villages Countesthorpe in Leicestershire, United Kingdom, Occhiobello in Italy and Renningen in Baden-Württemberg, Germany.

See also
 Communes of the Essonne department

References

External links

Official website 
Official blog 

Mayors of Essonne Association 

Communes of Essonne